Sylva Zalmanson (born Siberia, 1944) is a Soviet-born Jewish Prisoner of Zion, human rights activist, artist and engineer who settled in Israel in 1974.

Early life 
Born in Siberia in 1944 to a middle-class Jewish family from Riga. The family escaped the Nazis and returned to Riga in 1945, after the Soviets defeated the Nazis and liberated Latvia. While she was a university student at the Riga Polytechnic University, she became engaged in Zionist activities, distributing Hebrew-language study books to different Jewish communities around the Soviet Union, listening to Israel Radio programs in Russian, and other activities that were considered illegal under Soviet law.

 Zalmanson graduated Riga Polytechnic University in 1968, worked as an engineer, and dreamed of living in Israel. Repeatedly requesting and being denied an exit visa to leave the Soviet Union for Israel, Zalmanson and her husband Eduard Kuznetsov became members of a group of activists in a Zionist underground cell which came up with a plan to escape.

The Leningrad plane hijackers case 
The plan was called "Operation Wedding," (AKA Dymshits–Kuznetsov hijacking affair): the group would buy all the tickets to a local flight as if they are going to a wedding. 
Once on board, they would take over the controls of the "borrowed" government plane, and Major Mark Dymshits, a former Soviet military pilot and Jewish refusenik, would fly the aircraft, under the radar, over the Soviet border. 
Sylva recruited most of the group members, including her husband Eduard Kuznetsov and two brothers: Wolf Zalmanson and Israel Zalmanson. Aware that the KGB was watching and waiting, thanks to an informant, they nevertheless decided to go through with the plan.

On 15 June 1970, moments before boarding the Antonov An-2, the group was arrested and tried for "high treason". Sylva was the only woman on the trial that took place on 15 December 1970, and the first to go up the stand, she said:

Sylva received 10 years in Soviet Gulag: 3 years for the escape attempt, 7 years of "anti-Soviet propaganda", referring to Sylva's distribution of Hebrew learning books. Sylva's husband Edward Kuznetsov and the group's pilot, Mark Dymshits, received a death sentence.  The death sentences were reduced to 15 years after only 8 days, due to massive free world pressure. The Let My People Go! campaign brought awareness to the world and tens of thousands of people demonstrated all over the world demanding the release of the activists and that Soviet Jews were given the opportunity to emigrate.

Migration to Israel before and after the trial 
During the time Zalmanson and the other Zionist activists were imprisoned, and as a result of the diplomatic pressure put on the Soviet authorities, hundreds of thousands of Jews received visas to leave.
Between 1948 and the trial, 10,720 Soviet Jews left the Soviet Union. After the trial and until 1979, around 300,000 Soviet Jews emigrated.

From prison to freedom 
Sylva spent four years in Potma women’s penal colony and was later put in solitary confinement, after hitting another camp's inmate who made anti-semitic remarks.
On 22 August 1974, Sylva got an early release, due to a secret prisoners exchange between the Soviet government and the Israeli government who caught a Soviet spy, Yuri Linov who was exchanged for Sylva Zalmanson and Heinrich Shefter, a Bulgarian Jew, UN employee who was arrested by the Bulgarian Security Service and sentenced to death for espionage, apparently solely for the purpose of extorting Linov's release.

In Israel, Sylva worked as an engineer in the aerial industry but continued her non-stop activity for the release of her family and friends, including a 16-day hunger strike in front of the United Nations headquarters in New York in 1976, refusing to eat to the point of losing consciousness.

Most of the group, including Sylva's husband and brother were released in April 1979, due to a prisoners exchange with the American government that caught two Soviet spies in New Jersey.

Today
Today, Sylva lives in Israel. She and Edward had a daughter and were divorced two years after his release, in 1981 without a trial.
For years, until her retirement in 2005, Sylva worked as a Mechanical Engineer. She started painting in 1992, working in acrylics, oil and mixed media. Sylva became a member of the "Painters and Sculptors Association of Israel" and has exhibited in Israel, the US, UK, Italy, Romania, and Finland.

Sylva and Edward's only daughter, Anat Zalmanson-Kuznetsov, an Israeli Filmmaker, directed a documentary film in 2016 about their story, Operation Wedding.

References

External links 
 Official Website of Sylva Zalmanson's artwork 
 "OPERATION WEDDING" A documentary film by Anat Zalmanson-Kuznetsov
 Sylva Zalmanson: From Soviet Prisoner Of Zion To Accomplished Israeli Artist
 When Ingrid Bergman Ate a Soviet Labor Camp Dinner for Sylva Zalmanson. National Library of Israel
 The Israeli Artist Sylva Zalmanson
 AP Archive  ARTIST SYLVA ZALMANSON ARRIVES IN TEL AVIV
 Where Are They Now? / From Hijacker to Painter
 50 years ago, a failed hijacking brought light into the world. Times of Israel

1944 births
Living people
Russian human rights activists
Women human rights activists
Jewish artists
Russian women engineers
Soviet Jews
20th-century women engineers
Israeli human rights activists